The third season of the Australian drama Sea Patrol premiered as Sea Patrol 3: Red Gold on the Nine Network on 18 May 2009. Principal location filming was, as in past seasons, completed in and around the area of Mission Beach, Queensland.  It has an announced budget of A$17 million.     The continued presence of the production in north Queensland has been hailed as "a major boon for our local film and television industry" by Rod Welford, the Queensland Minister for Education, Training and the Arts.
Sea Patrol season 3 finished filming in mid-February. The series kicked off with ET (David Lyons) being killed in a diving accident.
Sea Patrol 3 still has the Armidale Class Patrol Boat.
Two new recurring stars Blair McDonough and Jessica Napier played a married couple, Matt and Simone Robsenn who are the local dive masters. Sea Patrol season 3 premiered on 18 May 2009. It aired every Monday night on Channel 9 at 8.30.

Casting

Main cast

Recurring cast

Episodes 
{| class="wikitable plainrowheaders" width="100%" style="margin-right: 0;"
|-
! style="background-color: #FF6464; color:black;"| Seriesepisode 
! style="background-color: #FF6464; color:black;"| Seasonepisode 
! style="background-color: #FF6464; color:black;"| Title
! style="background-color: #FF6464; color:black;"| Directed by
! style="background-color: #FF6464; color:black;"| Written by
! style="background-color: #FF6464; color:black;"| Original air date
! style="background-color: #FF6464; color:black;"| Viewers(millions)

|}

See also

 List of Sea Patrol episodes

References

General references 
 
 
 
 

Sea Patrol
2009 Australian television seasons